Mankind: The Story of All of Us is an American documentary television series on History that premiered on November 13, 2012 in the US and the UK, and on November 14, 2012 in Asia. The broadcast is narrated by Josh Brolin in the United States, Stephen Fry in the UK, and Jack Thompson in Australia and New Zealand. Mediaset in Italy aired the program on Italia 1 on 12 July 2013. The Hollywood Reporter and The New York Times gave overall positive reviews to the series.

Episodes

References

External links
 Official site
 Official Episode Guide (History Channel UK site)
 The History Channel Australia and New Zealand Page Mankind Page
 

Documentary television series about science
History (American TV channel) original programming